Drawn is the ninth studio album of Filipino singer-actress Regine Velasquez-Alcasid, released on August 1, 1998. The album was recorded from 1997 to 1998. This is the first album that Velasquez ventured into soul and R&B music coming from her previous Asian-pop appeal. It was executively produced by Mark J. Feist of the MJF Company and co-produced by Viva Records. The album is distributed in the Philippines by Viva Music Group. Mark J. Feist also arranged all the tracks, wrote & co-wrote five songs and played instruments throughout. The album was certified 7x Platinumby the  Philippine Association of the Record Industry (PARI) for sales of 240,000 units in the Philippines.

Track listing

Personnel
Production
Mark J. Feist – arranger except Linlangin Mo and Whenever We Say Goodbye; drums and synthesizers programming for all tracks
Alex Daye – background vocals for How Could You Leave
Charlotte Gibson – background vocals for Once In A Lifetime Love and Emotion
Zebedee Zuniga – background vocals for Whenever We Say Goodbye
Arnold Buena – arranger for Whenever We Say Goodbye
Raul Mitra – arranger for Linlangin Mo
Terrence Elliot – guitars for Once In A Lifetime Love, Love Again, Emotion and Our Love
all tracks are mixed and recorded at Sailor Records Studio except the tracks Once In A Lifetime Love and Linlangin Mo which recorded at Capitol Recording Studio.

See also
Regine Velasquez discography

References

Regine Velasquez albums
1998 albums